Gao Village a minor village featured within the shenmo fantasy novel Journey to the West, a Chinese literary classic written in the Ming Dynasty. Gao Village is a village that remains rather near to the main Tang Dynasty - thus being within China. Around chapter 18, Tang Sanzang and Sun Wukong would arrive at this seemingly small village. Gao Village is run by an old man named Mr. Gao and his hard working villagers, including his wife and 3 daughters(One of them is Gao Cuilan who was once a partner of Zhu Bajie. This village is reputed for its amount of vegetarian food - as seen with Zhu Bajie, Squire Gao's son-in-law. After Bajie is effectively subdued by Wukong due to his exceedingly gluttonous and lustful ways, this village's overall provisional production rises to a large margin. Sanzang, Wukong, and his new disciple all soon leave this village and continue their journey westward. This village would not be shown again following Bajie's subjugation during chapter 19.

The following here is a list of notable residents.

Squire Gao 
Possibly the leader of this village, Gao has a wife and three daughters. When he heard that Bajie has saved Cuilan, he is first objecting to it because he believes that Bajie is a greedy eater despite working hard with chores and duties. When Cuilan is trapped, Gao attempts to hire spiritualists to get rid of Bajie, but all of them failed and disappeared. When Wukong and Sanzang arrive to the village, Wukong volunteers to get rid of Bajie by making his appearance identical to Cuilan to lure Bajie. The latter had a fight which eventually resulted into Bajie losing. He joins Wukong and Sanzang on the journey to the west.

Squire Gao's messenger 
The messenger is  loyal to Gao and tries his best to get a spiritualist to get rid of Bajie. When he saw Wukong, he was scared and refused to let him in because of his ugly appearance but after listening to Sanzang, the messenger invites them inside.

Gao Cuilan 
Cuilan is Bajie's wife. She is saved by Bajie after being kidnapped. She eventually marries him until Bajie shows his true appearance. In a Chinese book written by an author named Lin Yiye which is not entirely notable, it stated that Cuilan had cheated on Bajie and now has a son.

See also
 Journey to the West

References

 Journey to the West, chapter 18-19 - Wu Cheng-en

Journey to the West
Fictional populated places in China